Willem Piso (in Dutch  Willem Pies, in Latin Gulielmus Piso, also called Guilherme Piso in Portuguese)  (1611 in Leiden – 28 November 1678 in Amsterdam) was a Dutch physician and  naturalist who participated as an expedition doctor in Dutch Brazil from 1637 – 1644, sponsored by count Johan Maurits van Nassau-Siegen and the Dutch West India Company. Piso became one of the founders of tropical medicine.

Life and career 

Piso was born in Leiden to church organist Hermann Pies and Cornelia van Liesvelt. He studied in Leiden and received a degree in medicine from Caen in 1633 and settled in Amsterdam as a doctor. In 1637, he was offered a position in the Dutch West India Company as a physician to Count Johan Maurits van Nassau-Siegen (1604-1679), governor of Dutch Brazil. He left for Brazil along with the astronomer Georg Marcgrave and the painters Albert Eckhout and Frans Post. There, he recommended the consumption of fresh fish, vegetables, and fruits after discovering that soldiers and seamen suffered from physical problems including night blindness resulting from malnutrition. Piso identified Brazilian lemons as being particularly effective in overcoming scurvy. In 1644, Piso returned along with the Count to the Netherlands. Piso lived in Leiden and then moved to Amsterdam, where he was a part of the scientific community. In 1655, he became inspector of the Amsterdam Medical College, and later its dean.

Together with Georg Marcgrave, and originally published by Joannes de Laet, Piso wrote the Historia Naturalis Brasiliae (1648), an important early Western insight into Brazilian flora and fauna. He also published as part of this work four parts titled De medicina Brasiliense in which he examined tropical diseases and indigenous therapies (including the use of ipecacuanha-root and leaves of the jaborandi), Piso collected plants and animals in Brazil. In 1658, he published another work, which is a second edition of the Historia titled De Indiae Utriusque re naturali et medica. He was the sole author of this and he is said to have tried to undermine Markgraf's work, and many careless errors, leading to criticism from Markgraf's brother and even Linnaeus.

He is buried near Rembrandt in the Westerkerk in Amsterdam.

Honours
A minor planet, 11240 Piso, and 2 types of plant genus; Pisonia, and Pisoniella both belonging to the family Nyctaginaceae, are named for him.

References

External links 
Biography at Illustrated Garden.org
De Indiae utriusque re naturali et medica libri quatuordecim :quorum contenta pagina sequens exhibet

1611 births
1678 deaths
17th-century Dutch physicians
17th-century Latin-language writers
Dutch naturalists
17th-century Dutch naturalists
17th-century Dutch botanists
People from Leiden
Sailors on ships of the Dutch West India Company
17th-century Dutch scientists
People of Dutch Brazil
Pre-Linnaean botanists